Al Oud Cemetery is a public cemetery in al-Oud, Riyadh, Saudi Arabia, known for being the resting place of many kings, crown princes and royals of the second and current Saudi states. The word "al-ʿŪud", in Peninsular Arabic means "elder (older person)", likely referring to King Abdulaziz, who was buried in the cemetery.

Location
Al Oud graveyard is situated at Al Ghafran district and around 1 km away from Batha'a street, the center of Riyadh. More specifically, the cemetery is on the right hand side of Batha'a street going south, between Al Diryah and Manhub. It is some 2 1/2 km from the Imam Turki bin Abdullah mosque. In March 2012, the environmental health directorate of the Riyadh municipality started a project to mark each grave electronically. People usually go there to pay respects to the dead.

Burials
The cemetery is well-known, since it is the resting place for majority of the Saudi royal members, including King Abdulaziz, King Fahd, King Khalid, King Faisal, King Saud, and King Abdullah.

Other senior royal figures, such as Prince Sultan, Prince Fahd, Prince Ahmed, Sultana bint Turki bin Ahmad Al Sudairi, wife of King Salman, Hussa bint Turki al Awwal, and Sultan bin Faisal bin Turki bin Abdullah were also buried there. The others include Prince Nasser, Prince Faisal, Prince Abdul Majeed, Prince Badr, Prince Muhammed, Prince Turki, Sultana bint Abdulaziz Al Saud, and Saud bin Abdullah Al Saud.

Well-known writer and public-figure Ghazi Abdul Rahman Al Gosaibi was buried there, too. The graveyard is being used for both commoners and royalty.

References

Buildings and structures in Riyadh
Burials at Al Oud cemetery
Burial sites of the House of Saud
Cemeteries in Saudi Arabia
Sunni cemeteries